Amydona may refer to:
 Amydona Walker, 1855, a genus of butterflies in the family Limacodidae, synonym of Perola
 Amydona Walker, 1855, a genus of butterflies in the family Lasiocampidae, synonym of Trabala